This is a list of tartans from around the world. The examples shown below are generally emblematic of a particular association. However, for each clan or family, there are often numerous other official or unofficial variations. There are also innumerable tartan designs that are not affiliated with any group, but were simply created for aesthetic reasons.

British noble and regimental tartans

Tartans in this section are those of the current or former British royal family, of individual British nobility members, and of British military regiments that use traditional Scottish attire, mostly Highland regiments.

UK military or Government tartans 
A number of tartans, worn by UK military units, are known as Government tartans, and are defined in a Standard currently maintained by Defence Equipment and Support within the Ministry of Defence.  They are known by a number, a name, or both.  The commonest are Government 1, Black Watch; Government 1A, a slightly lighter form of Black Watch worn by the Royal Regiment of Scotland; and Royal Stewart.

The following list includes those Government tartans worn by UK military units as from the creation of the Royal Regiment of Scotland in 2006 onwards.  Other units wear a named clan tartan without it being defined by this standard, e.g. 32nd (Scottish) Signal Regiment and the pipers of the Royal Corps of Signals wear Grant, and the tartan of 154 (Scottish) Regiment Royal Logistics Corps is MacDuff.  For the Royal Regiment of Scotland, the pipes and drums in each battalion wear the uniform of their antecedent regiment (as listed below) for ceremonial purposes, but the Regiment's standard Government 1A for non-ceremonial purposes.

Note: 1 SCOTS Pipers and Drummers were disbanded in 2021.

Scottish clan tartans
The tartans in this list are those ascribed to particular clans of Scotland, including Highland, Lowland, Isles, and Borders clans.  Their status varies widely; armigerous clans generally accept them, while some have been officially adopted or rejected by a clan chief.

Scottish non-clan family tartans 
Tartans in this list are ascribed to specific families or surnames, though not to Scottish clans; they range in date from 21st century to considerably older.

Non-Scottish family tartans 
These are (mostly modern) tartans created for families without a direct connection to Scotland.

Cornish

Organisational tartans 
Tartans in this list are modern ones pertaining to particular commercial, non-profit, and military organisations.

Regional tartans 
Tartans in these lists were created (mostly in modern times) for particular national and sub-national jurisdictions, most often officially, though with some exceptions.

Australia

Canada

Cornwall

United States

See also
Border tartan
Scottish Register of Tartans
Scottish Tartans Authority
Vestiarium Scoticum § Tartans – tables of tartans listed in this antique but questionably accurate manuscript, with the addition of thread counts and Scottish Tartans Society designations

References

External links

 Scottish Register of Tartans
 Scottish Tartans Authority  - The only organisation dedicated to the preservation and promotion of Tartan 
 Scottish Tartans World Register
 Scottish Kilts Collection 
 highland 

 
Tartans